Jiang Kewei (born 30 January 1989) is a Chinese former footballer.

Career statistics

Club

Notes

References

1989 births
Living people
Chinese footballers
Association football midfielders
Chinese Super League players
Shanghai Shenxin F.C. players